Buster Bros. Collection is a video game developed by Mitchell Corporation and published by Capcom for the PlayStation.

Gameplay
Buster Bros. Collection is a compilation of Buster Bros., Super Buster Bros., and Buster Buddies.

The graphics and sound are the same as the arcade versions, but the music is emulated by Portable Sound Format (PSF) files, which are very similar to MIDI.

Reception
Next Generation reviewed the PlayStation version of the game, rating it three stars out of five, and stated that "fans of Bust-A-Move and other simple puzzle games may get a kick out of this one."

Reviewing the PlayStation Buster Bros. Collection, Doctor Devon of GamePro remarked that the game makes no real use of the PlayStation hardware in terms of either graphics or controls, and is less fun to play than the arcade version due to the load times every time the player character is hit. He nonetheless judged that the "classic" gameplay makes the game worthwhile for either newcomers to the series or Buster Bros. fans moved by nostalgia.

Reviews
GameSpot - May 13, 1997
IGN - Apr 21, 1997
Game Revolution - Jul, 1997
GF3K.com (Nov 16, 2002)
Absolute Playstation (Apr, 1998)
Gamezilla (1997)

References

1997 video games
Capcom video game compilations
PlayStation (console) games
PlayStation (console)-only games
Video games developed in Japan